Hobson's Choice is a 1920 British comedy drama film directed by Percy Nash and starring Joe Nightingale, Joan Ritz and Arthur Pitt. A Salford bootmaker is irritated to learn his daughter is to marry one of his cobblers, and his outrage grows when they set up a successful shop which challenges his own for business. It is the first film based on the 1916 play Hobson's Choice by Harold Brighouse.

References

External links

Watch Hobson's Choice for free on BFI Player

1920 films
British silent feature films
British black-and-white films
1920 comedy-drama films
British comedy-drama films
1920s British films
Silent comedy-drama films